Dale Holmes (born 4 June 1967) is a former Australian rules footballer who played with North Melbourne in the Victorian Football League (VFL), where he wore the number 44. 

In 2004 Holmes was living in Sydney and was appointed as the General Manager of the AFL (NSW-ACT) Commission. In 2011 he was the first CEO of the expansion team, Greater Western Sydney Giants, but was sacked in October of that year. Outside of football, Holmes works in the financial services industry.

References

External links 
		

Living people
1967 births
Australian rules footballers from Victoria (Australia)
North Melbourne Football Club players
Myrtleford Football Club players